Weather Diaries is the fifth studio album by English rock band Ride. The album was released on 16 June 2017, and is the first Ride album since 1996's Tarantula. The album was produced by English DJ Erol Alkan and mixed by long-time Ride collaborator Alan Moulder.

Release
The album was supported by two singles: "Charm Assault", released on 21 February 2017, and "Home Is a Feeling" released the next day.

The Japanese edition features the bonus track, which is the remix edition of "Home Is a Feeling", also with the limited edition Tote Bag.

Reception

Reviews were largely positive. Spin felt the album had less shoegaze and was a simplified sound compared to early albums.

Track listing 

 Japanese Bonus Track

Personnel
Ride
 Mark Gardener – lead vocals, guitar
 Andy Bell – vocals, guitar
 Steve Queralt – bass guitars
 Loz Colbert – drums, percussion, vocals on "Rocket Silver Symphony"

Additional personnel
 Erol Alkan – producing
 Alan Moulder – mixing
 Claudio Szynkier as Babe, Terror – remix, Japanese bonus track

Charts

References 

2017 albums
Ride (band) albums
PIAS Recordings albums
Wichita Recordings albums
Albums produced by Erol Alkan